Karim Uddin Barbhuiya, also known by his daak naam Saju,  is an Indian All India United Democratic Front politician and businessman. He has been serving as a Member of Assam Legislative Assembly for Sonai since 2021.

Early life and family
Karim Uddin Barbhuiya was born into a Bengali Muslim family from Kanakpur, Cachar district, Assam. His father, Rahim Uddin Barbhuiya, was supposedly the descendant of a Mirashdar that was endowed the title of Barbhuiya by the erstwhile Raja of Kachar for paying a fee of 50 monetary units.

In 2019, Barbhuiya graduated from the Chaudhary Charan Singh University in Meerut with a Bachelor of Arts degree.

Career
Barbhuiya is the general secretary of the All India United Democratic Front's central committee and is also the head of the party's Barpeta branch. During 2016 Assam Legislative Assembly elections he contested unsuccessfully against Aminul Haque Laskar but in 2021 Assam Legislative Assembly elections, he defeated Aminul Haque Laskar by a margin of 19,654 votes and was elected into the Assam Legislative Assembly.

Notes

References

All India United Democratic Front politicians
Assam politicians
People from Cachar district
21st-century Bengalis
Living people
1970 births
Chaudhary Charan Singh University alumni
Assam MLAs 2021–2026